Duniya (The Intrinsic Passion of Mysterious Joy) is the debut album of Loop Guru, released on December 13, 1994, through Nation Records.

Track listing

References

External links 
 

1994 debut albums
Dubtronica albums
Worldbeat albums
Nation Records albums